Kolsassberg is a municipality in the district Innsbruck-Land in the Austrian state of Tyrol located about 19 km east of Innsbruck and 2 km above Kolsass. The location was founded around 1196.

Population

References

External links

Cities and towns in Innsbruck-Land District